Jarrell is a city in Williamson County, Texas, United States. It was incorporated as a city in 2001. The total population is 1,753 according to the 2020 census.

History

Founded in 1909 by real estate developer O.D. Jarrell, along with E. C. Haeber and B. N. Dover, the town was settled at the intersection of an old stagecoach road and the Bartlett Western Railroad that was under construction. Soon after the railroad was completed, a saloon, two stores, a post office, and a bank were built. Because of the proximity of Jarrell to the railroad, Jarrell received all of the people and most of the buildings of nearby Corn Hill, Texas, thus killing that town.   The city reached a population peak of 500 residents in 1914. The closing of the railway in 1935 and the decline of the cotton industry, however, led to a long-term recession. At one point, Jarrell had only 200 residents. After this low point, the city experienced a recovery that increased its population to 410 by 1990. Over 15 new businesses opened in Jarrell in 2009.

Tornadoes
Jarrell has been affected by 2 major tornadoes in its history. The first one was an F3 that occurred on May 17, 1989, killing 1 person and injuring 28 people. It damaged mainly the southern side of town.
On May 27, 1997, an F5 tornado devastated the northern side of town. The hardest-hit area was the Double Creek Estates subdivision, which was completely obliterated, with all of the homes in the neighborhood being destroyed. 27 people were killed in the tornado.

Another tornado, albeit rated EF1, hit the south side of town on October 24, 2022.

Education

Jarrell is served by the Jarrell Independent School District. The district currently has two elementary, one middle school and one high school.

Between 2012 and 2019 student enrollment more than doubled. The district's middle school was built in 2014, but is undergoing an expansion in 2018–2019 to gain more classroom and science labs so that it can better accommodate the growing population of students. The high school is also being expanded including the addition of a performing arts center.

The current superintendent for the district is Dr. Toni M. Hicks. A native Texan, Dr. Hicks earned a Bachelor of Science in Interdisciplinary Studies from Texas State University. She began her educational career in El Paso ISD as an English as a Second Language teacher and then later as a middle school teacher in Leander ISD. While working as a full-time teacher, she completed a Master of Education from the University of Mary Hardin-Baylor.

Demographics

As of the 2020 United States census, there were 1,753 people, 417 households, and 365 families residing in the city.

Government

The current Mayor of Jarrell is Larry Bush. City council meets on the 3rd Tuesday of each month at City Hall.
Jarrell Emergency services are provided by the Jarrell Fire Department operating under Williamson County ESD#5, with Chief Mark McAdams. The City's chief of police is Kevin Denney. The Police department serves a growing population and maintains a very low crime rate.

Climate
The climate in the area is characterized by hot, humid summers and generally mild to cool winters.  According to the Köppen Climate Classification system, Jarrell has a humid subtropical climate, abbreviated "Cfa" on climate maps.

References

External links

 Official City of Jarrell website
 
 Official Jarrell VFD Website

Cities in Texas
Cities in Williamson County, Texas
Greater Austin